Patson Daka (born 9 October 1998) is a Zambian professional footballer who plays as a forward for  club Leicester City and the Zambia national team.

Coming through the youth system, Daka played for local club Kafue Celtic, who sent him on loan to Nchanga Rangers and Power Dynamos. In January 2017, Daka joined Red Bull Salzburg's reserve team Liefering in Austria, and was then made part of the first team in summer 2017. He helped Red Bull Salzburg win four Austrian Bundesliga titles and three Austrian Cups. In summer 2021, Daka joined Leicester City in the Premier League.

Daka represents Zambia internationally, making his senior debut in 2015 aged 16.

Club career

Early career
Daka began his youth career at Kafue Celtic, joining their under-12s, before moving on to the under-14s in 2007, and to the under-17s in 2010.

In summer 2014, Daka was sent on a one-year loan to Nchanga Rangers in the Zambia Super League. He was then loaned out to Power Dynamos in summer 2015. Before that, he did some practice sessions with Lille but finally didn't sign with the French side. At Dynamos, he ended the season as the club's top scorer with 12 goals.

At the end of the 2016 season, he was awarded as the Zambia Super League Young Player of the Year.

Liefering

Daka initially moved to Austria when he signed with Liefering on a half-season loan from Kafue Celtic.

Red Bull Salzburg
Daka signed with Red Bull Salzburg in 2017. He helped the club win the UEFA Youth League, scoring two goals in two games. On 27 November, Daka scored against Genk in the 2019–20 UEFA Champions League, becoming the first Zambian player to score in the competition's group stage.

On 18 December 2019, Daka extended his contract with Salzburg until the summer of 2024.

On 30 September 2020, he scored a brace in a 3–1 win over Maccabi Tel Aviv in the play-off round to qualify to the 2020–21 UEFA Champions League. On 21 May 2021, Daka was named Austrian Bundesliga player of the season after registering 27 goals in 28 games, as the club won their fourth successive league title.

Leicester City

On 30 June 2021, Daka signed for Premier League club Leicester City on a five-year contract, for a reported fee of £23 million. Daka made his debut for the club with an appearance off the bench in Leicester's 1–0 triumph over reigning Premier League champions Manchester City in the FA Community Shield on 7 August. On 23 August, Daka made his Premier League debut as a substitute for Harvey Barnes in a 4–1 away defeat to West Ham United. 

On 16 October, he scored his first goal for Leicester City in a 4–2 win against Manchester United at King Power Stadium. He followed this up on 20 October by scoring all four goals in a 4–3 win over Spartak Moscow in the 2021–22 UEFA Europa League, becoming the first Leicester player to score 4 in a game since 1958. On 25 November 2021, Daka became Leicester's all-time leading goalscorer in European competition by scoring in a 3–1 Europa League victory over Legia Warsaw.

International career
Daka made his senior debut for Zambia in a 2–0 friendly victory over Malawi on 10 May 2015. He was the 2017 CAF Young Player of the Year.

Personal life 
Daka's father, Nathtali Daka, was a former footballer who played as a winger for local club Kafue-based Nitrogen Stars. Daka is married to Zambian sprinter Suwilanji Mpondela. He is a devout Christian.

Career statistics

Club

International

Scores and results list Zambia's goal tally first.

Honours

Red Bull Salzburg Youth
 UEFA Youth League: 2016–17

Red Bull Salzburg
 Austrian Bundesliga: 2017–18, 2018–19, 2019–20, 2020–21
 Austrian Cup: 2018–19, 2019–20, 2020–21

Leicester City
 FA Community Shield: 2021

Zambia U20
 Africa U-20 Cup of Nations: 2017
 COSAFA U-20 Cup: 2016

Individual
 Africa U-20 Cup of Nations Best Player: 2017
 Africa U-20 Cup of Nations Best XI: 2017
 CAF Youth Player of the Year: 2017
 Zambia Super League Young Player of the Year: 2014, 2016
 Zambia Sportsman of the Year: 2017
 Austrian Bundesliga Team of the Year: 2020–21
 Austrian Bundesliga Player of the Year: 2020–21
Austrian Bundesliga Top scorer: 2020–21

References

External links

Profile at the Leicester City F.C. website

1998 births
Living people
People from Chingola
Zambian Christians
Zambian footballers
Zambia youth international footballers
Zambia under-20 international footballers
Zambia international footballers
Association football forwards
Kafue Celtic F.C. players
Green Buffaloes F.C. players
Power Dynamos F.C. players
FC Liefering players
FC Red Bull Salzburg players
Leicester City F.C. players
Zambia Super League players
2. Liga (Austria) players
Austrian Football Bundesliga players
Premier League players
2019 Africa U-23 Cup of Nations players
Zambian expatriate footballers
Expatriate footballers in Austria
Expatriate footballers in England
Zambian expatriate sportspeople in Austria
Zambian expatriate sportspeople in England
Zambia A' international footballers
2016 African Nations Championship players